Andrea Bouma (born 6 November, 1999) is a Dutch athlete who competes as a sprinter.

Bouma was the Dutch champion over 400 metres in 2020.

She won the silver medal in the women's 4 × 400 m relay at the 2022 World Indoor Championships held in Belgrade, racing as part of the Dutch team for the heats. Bouma competed for her country outdoors in the women's 4 x 100 m relay at the 2022 World Athletics Championships in Eugene, Oregon. She helped again the Dutch women's 4 x 400 m relay team running in the heats at the European Championships Munich 2022 to earn gold.

Personal bests
 100 metres – 11.87 (+1.4 m/s, Vught 2017)
 200 metres – 23.71 (+1.4 m/s, La Chaux-de-Fonds 2021)
 400 metres – 52.73 (Geneva 2022)

References

1999 births
Living people
World Athletics Championships athletes for the Netherlands
World Athletics Indoor Championships medalists
21st-century Dutch women
European Athletics Championships winners
Sportspeople from South Holland